The Lady Wood Tour was the second headlining concert tour by Swedish recording artist Tove Lo in support of her second major-label studio album Lady Wood (2016). The tour began on 6 February 2017, in Seattle, Washington, at the Showbox SoDo, and it concluded on 14 October 2017 at the Austin City Limits Music Festival in Austin, Texas.

Background
11 North American tour dates and 10 European tour dates (21 dates in total), were officially announced on 23 October 2016, 5 days before the release of Lady Wood. Tickets for the shows went on sale on 28 October 2016. All 11 of the North American dates are supported by American singer Phoebe Ryan, and all 10 of the European dates are supported by Broods, a music duo from New Zealand. More dates for various music festivals and other miscellaneous concerts across Europe, South America, Oceania, and United States were announced at separate times. On 16 February 2017 it was announced that Lo would be supporting Coldplay on their A Head Full of Dreams Tour from 11 June 2017 to 8 October 2017, separate from the Lady Wood Tour.

Set list
This set list is representative of the show on 7 February 2017 in Portland, Oregon. It does not represent all dates throughout the tour.

 "True Disaster"
 "Lady Wood"
 "Influence"
 "Moments"
 "The Way That I Am"
 "Not on Drugs"
 "Thousand Miles"
 "Vibes"
 "Got Love"
 "Talking Body"
 "Imaginary Friend"
 "Keep It Simple"
 "WTF Love Is"
 "Flashes"
 "Cool Girl"
Encore
"Bitches"
 "Habits (Stay High)"

Shows

Cancelled and postponed shows

References

Tove Lo concert tours
2017 concert tours